Etilevodopa (TV-1203) is a dopaminergic agent which was developed as a treatment for Parkinson's disease. It is the ethyl ester of levodopa. It was never marketed.

See also 
 Melevodopa

References 

Prodrugs
Catecholamines
Dopamine agonists
Propionate esters
Ethyl esters
Abandoned drugs